Antoine Mendy may refer to:

Antoine Mendy (basketball) (born 1983), Senegalese basketball player
Antoine Mendy (footballer) (born 2004), French footballer